Sarah McVie (born March 21, 1978) is a Canadian actress. She is most noted for her regular role as Valerie Szalinsky in Workin' Moms, for which she received a Canadian Screen Award nomination for Best Supporting Actress in a Comedy Series at the 9th Canadian Screen Awards in 2021.

References

External links

21st-century Canadian actresses
Canadian film actresses
Canadian television actresses
Canadian stage actresses
Living people
1978 births